Lasu may refer to:

People
 Amy Lasu (born 1995), South Sudanese football player
 Nicklas Lasu (born 1989), Swedish ice hockey player

Places
 Lasu, Khuzestan, Iran

Other
 Lagos State University